Kenneth MacKenzie Murchison, Jr. (September 29, 1872 – December 15, 1938) was a prominent American Beaux-Arts and Gothic Revival architect.

Early life
He was born in Brooklyn, New York City in 1872.  Murchison graduated from Columbia University in 1894 and from the École nationale supérieure des Beaux-Arts in Paris, France, in 1900.

Career
Two years after graduating from the École des Beaux-Arts, he opened an office in New York where his first major commissions were for railroad stations for the Pennsylvania Railroad company. Among the stations he designed are Hoboken Terminal in New Jersey; the Lackawanna Terminal and the Lehigh Valley Terminal, both in Buffalo, New York; and Baltimore Pennsylvania Station.

In New York, he was well known as one of the founders of the Beaux Arts Balls, elaborate costume parties benefiting architects who had fallen on hard times.  He also was a founder of the Mendelsohn Glee Club.  At the time of his death, he had started work on a new Dunes Club to replace the one destroyed a few months earlier.

Personal life
On April 5, 1902, Murchison married Aurelie de Mauriac.  They lived in the Beaux-Arts Apartments, which he designed, at 310 E. 44th St.  They were the parents of two daughters:

 Katherine Murchison, who married Hays Browning.
 Aurelie Murchison, who married Edouard de Wardener.

Murchison died suddenly, at 11:45 p.m. on December 15, 1938, while at the Interborough Rapid Transit Company's Grand Central–42nd Street station, as The New York Times reported.

Buildings

He also designed:
 Johnstown, Pennsylvania, Station-Johnstown (Amtrak station)
 Jamaica (LIRR station), Jamaica, New York.
 Long Beach (LIRR station), Long Beach, New York.
 The original Dunes Club, Narragansett, Rhode Island. (Only the gatehouse remains after the 1938 hurricane.)
 Sands Point Bath Club, East Egg, LI (destroyed by fire in 1986)
 Forest Hills Stadium, West Side Tennis Club, Forest Hills, Queens, New York City
 New Colonial Hotel, Nassau
 First National Bank Building, Hoboken, New Jersey
 The  Murchison Building, Wilmington, North Carolina
 Co-op Apartments, 39 E. 79th St., New York.
 The Tully House (Residence), Mill Neck, New York
 Luola Chapel, built at Orton Plantation in Brunswick, North Carolina, in memory of his sister who died in 1916. He also added wings to the main house.
 Summer Residences, Narragansett, Rhode Island
 Primelles Building, Havana, Cuba (American Architect. Vol. 119, Part 1)
 St. Elmo Hall, home to the St. Elmo Society, at 111 Grove Street at Yale University, today known as Rosenfeld Hall.
 William A. Clark House (with Lord and Hewlett)

References

1872 births
1938 deaths
Architects from New York City
American alumni of the École des Beaux-Arts
American railway architects